Arthur Dewar (15 March 1934 — 10 January 2020) was a Scottish first-class cricketer.

Dewar was born in March 1934 at Perth, where he was educated at the Perth Academy. A club cricketer for Perthshire Cricket Club, Dewar made his debut for Scotland in first-class cricket against Ireland at Paisley in 1960. His second match against Warwickshire at Edgbaston bought him considerable success, with him taking bowling figures of 7 for 71 in Warwickshire's first innings; amongst his wickets were the Test cricketers Khalid Ibadulla and Tom Cartwright. He appeared in two further first-class matches in 1961, against the Marylebone Cricket Club and Ireland, before making a fifth and final appearance in 1962 against Warwickshire. Besides his 7 for 71 against Warwickshire in 1961, Dewar struggled to have an impact with the ball in the matches which followed, taking just 3 more wickets. In his five first-class matches, he took 11 wickets at an average of 33.27. Dewar died at Perth in January 2020.

References

External links
 

1934 births
2020 deaths
Cricketers from Perth, Scotland
People educated at Perth Academy
Scottish cricketers